The Silver Deputy Stakes is a Thoroughbred horse race held annually during the fourth week of August at Woodbine Racetrack in Toronto, Ontario, Canada. Open to two-year-old horses, it is contested over a distance of six and one half furlongs on Polytrack synthetic dirt.

In 2006, the race was run at 7.5 furlongs. 2009 will be its twelfth running.
 
In addition to the $100,000 purse, the event offers up to $10,000 in bonus money for eligible Ontario-bred horses as well as up to $15,150 Ontario Sired/Ontario Bred Breeder Awards.

The race is named for Windfields Farm stallion, Silver Deputy.

As of 2009 this race appears to be discontinued.

Winners since 2000

References
 2008 Silver deputy stakes at Woodbine Racetrack

Ungraded stakes races in Canada
Flat horse races for two-year-olds
1997 establishments in Ontario
Woodbine Racetrack
Recurring sporting events established in 1997